Dorset was a county constituency covering Dorset in southern England, which elected two Members of Parliament (MPs), traditionally known as knights of the shire, to the House of Commons of England from 1290 until 1707, to the House of Commons of Great Britain from 1707 to 1800, and to the House of Commons of the United Kingdom until 1832.

The Great Reform Act increased its representation to three MPs with effect from the 1832 general election, and under the Redistribution of Seats Act 1885 the constituency was abolished for the 1885 election, and replaced by four single-member divisions: North Dorset, South Dorset, East Dorset and West Dorset.

When elections were contested, the bloc vote system was used, but contests were rare. Even after the 1832 Reforms, only three of the nineteen elections before 1885 were contested; in the others, the nominated candidates were returned without a vote.

Members of Parliament

Before 1640

MPs 1640–1832

MPs 1832–1885

Election results

Elections in the 1830s

Calcraft's death caused a by-election.

Elections in the 1840s

Ashley-Cooper and Sturt both resigned by accepting the office of Steward of the Chiltern Hundreds causing a by-election.

Elections in the 1850s
Bankes was appointed Judge Advocate General of the Armed Forces, requiring a by-election.

Bankes' death caused a by-election.

Elections in the 1860s
Seymer resigned, causing a by-election.

Elections in the 1870s

Sturt was elevated to the peerage, becoming Lord Alington.

Elections in the 1880s

Notes

References 
 D Brunton & D H Pennington, Members of the Long Parliament (London: George Allen & Unwin, 1954)
Cobbett's Parliamentary history of England, from the Norman Conquest in 1066 to the year 1803 (London: Thomas Hansard, 1808) 
 F W S Craig, British Parliamentary Election Results 1832-1885 (2nd edition, Aldershot: Parliamentary Research Services, 1989)
 Maija Jansson (ed.), Proceedings in Parliament, 1614 (House of Commons) (Philadelphia: American Philosophical Society, 1988)
 J E Neale, The Elizabethan House of Commons (London: Jonathan Cape, 1949)
 J Holladay Philbin, Parliamentary Representation 1832 - England and Wales (New Haven: Yale University Press, 1965)
 Heywood Townshend, Historical Collections:: or, An exact Account of the Proceedings of the Four last Parliaments of Q. Elizabeth (1680) 
 British History Online - 'List of members nominated for Parliament of 1653', Diary of Thomas Burton esq, volume 4: March - April 1659 (1828),
 

Parliamentary constituencies in Dorset (historic)
Constituencies of the Parliament of the United Kingdom established in 1290
Constituencies of the Parliament of the United Kingdom disestablished in 1885